Christian Benda is a conductor, composer and cellist, descended from the eighteenth-century Benda family of composers. 
He performs worldwide both as a soloist and a conductor.
His numerous recordings include many classical standards such as Mozart, Rossini and Schubert overtures (notably, particularly distinguished performances of Boccherini cello sonatas, with his brother accompanying on the fortepiano, for the Naxos label) as well as the compositions of his ancestors Georg Anton (Jiří Antonín) Benda, František Benda and Jan Jiří Benda.
(Another ancestor of his was the conductor Hans von Benda, who was particularly active between the 1930s and the 1950s.) He serves as chief Conductor and artistic director of the Prague Sinfonia.

He was a Climate Ally in the "Tck Tck Tck: Time for Climate Justice" campaign.

References

External links 
Benda's Home page
ChristianBendaVEVO

Czech composers
Czech male composers
Czech conductors (music)
Male conductors (music)
Living people
Year of birth missing (living people)
21st-century conductors (music)
21st-century Czech male musicians
21st-century cellists